The Copa Callao, was an exhibition football competition hosted in Callao, Peru in the 2007. It features four Peruvian Primera División teams: Callao's major team Sport Boys as host, and guest teams, Deportivo Municipal, Universidad San Martín and Cienciano. All matches are played at the Estadio Miguel Grau in Callao,

Champions

Titles by club

2007 Copa Callao

First Round

Third Place

Final

References

 

Football competitions in Peru